The East–West pipeline is a natural gas pipeline in Turkmenistan.  It was constructed to carry natural gas from gas fields in eastern Turkmenistan to the coast of Caspian Sea across the southern part of the country.

History
In 2007–2008, Russia and Turkmenistan negotiated construction of the East–West pipeline to supply the planned Caspian Coastal pipeline, an extension of the Central Asia–Center gas pipeline system. The pipeline was to be built in cooperation with the Russian gas company Gazprom.  The main designated contractor was Zarubezhneftegaz, a subsidiary of Gazprom.  However, on 27 March 2009 after tensions between Russia and Turkmenistan over gas supplies from Turkmenistan to Russia, Turkmenistan launched an international tender for the pipeline.  Over 70 companies expressed their interest to participate in the project. In May 2010 it was announced that Turkmenistan will build the pipeline on its own.  Construction started in 2012 and was completed in December 2015.

Route
The pipeline starts from the Shatlyk compressor station at the eastern branch of the Central Asia–Center gas pipeline in Mary Province and runs to the Belek-1 compressor station at the western branch of the Central Asia–Center gas pipeline in Balkan Province.  From there, gas could be transported to Russia or, when constructed, through the Trans-Caspian Gas Pipeline to Azerbaijan and further to Europe.  In addition to export, the pipeline will supply the central and Caspian region of Turkmenistan.  The pipeline largely follows the route of existing pipelines.  It  creates a system connecting all the major gas fields of Turkmenistan.

Description
The pipeline is intended to be mainly supplied from the Galkynysh, Dauletabad, Yashlar, and Minara gas fields. The pipeline was built by Türkmennebitgazgurlushyk and is owned and operated by Türkmengaz. Design diameter of the pipeline is 1,420 millimeters.

See also

 Central Asia – China gas pipeline
 Dauletabad–Sarakhs–Khangiran pipeline
 Korpezhe–Kurt Kui pipeline
 Nabucco pipeline

References

Natural gas pipelines in Turkmenistan
Energy in Central Asia